Ilves is an Estonian surname meaning "lynx". Notable people with the surname include:
 Aapo Ilves (born 1970), Estonian poet, writer, artist and musician
 Andres Ilves, American journalist
 Evelin Ilves (born 1968), former First Lady of Estonia
 Ieva Ilves (born 1977), Latvian civil servant, former First Lady of Estonia
 Kristjan Ilves (born 1996), Estonian Nordic combined skier
 Toomas Hendrik Ilves (born 1953), former President of Estonia

References

Estonian-language surnames